Suresh Gore (1965 – 10 October 2020) was a Shiv Sena politician from Pune district, Maharashtra. He was a member of the 13th Maharashtra Legislative Assembly. He represented the Khed Alandi Assembly Constituency.

Life
Gore was elected to the Maharashtra Legislative Assembly for Shiv Sena in 2014. He represented the Khed Alandi Assembly Constituency. His term ended in 2019.

Gore was diagnosed with COVID-19 in September 2020, amid the COVID-19 pandemic in India. After receiving initial treatment in Chakan, Pune, he was moved to the Ruby Hospital in Pune. He died there from the disease on 10 October 2020, aged 55.

Positions held
 2012: Elected as member of Pune Zilla Parishad

See also
 Shirur Lok Sabha constituency

References

External links
 Shiv Sena Official website
 विद्यमान आमदार सुरेश गोरे यांनी आपला बालेकिल्ला चाकण-नाणेकरवाडी गट शाबूत ठेवला
 चाकण नगर परिषदेवर खेडचे आमदार सुरेश गोरे यांच्या नेतृत्वाखाली भगवा फडकला, शिवसेनेच्या पूजा साहेबराव कड चाकणच्या पहिल्या नगराध्यक्ष

1965 births
2020 deaths
Deaths from the COVID-19 pandemic in India
Maharashtra MLAs 2014–2019
People from Pune district
Maharashtra district councillors
Shiv Sena politicians